Norman Daniel Pope (1908–1985) was a professional rugby league footballer in the Australian competition, the New South Wales Rugby League.

Career
Pope played in the halves at the Eastern Suburbs club for five seasons in the years 1927–31.In the 1931 season Pope captained the side that lost to South Sydney in the 1931 Grand Final.

From 1932, he moved to the Maitland United club as captain-coach. Then he took on the captain-coach role at Tumbarumba for three seasons (1933-1936) before returning to Sydney.

He then joined the St George Dragons club, again taking on a captain-coach role (1937-1938).

In 1931 Pope represented New South Wales in an interstate match against Queensland, and later played in N.S.W. Country Firsts in 1933.

Pope died on 7 April 1985, aged 76.

References

 History Of The NSW Rugby League Finals; Steve Haddan
 The Encyclopedia Of Rugby League Players; Alan Whiticker & Glen Hudson

1908 births
1985 deaths
Australian rugby league coaches
Australian rugby league players
City New South Wales rugby league team players
Country New South Wales rugby league team players
New South Wales rugby league team players
Rugby league players from Sydney
St. George Dragons captains
St. George Dragons coaches
St. George Dragons players
Sydney Roosters players